Mies may refer to:

People
 Ludwig Mies van der Rohe (1886–1969), architect
Maria Mies (born 1931), German feminist
Richard W. Mies (born 1944), U.S. Navy admiral and fourth commander in chief of the United States Strategic Command
Mies Boissevain-van Lennep (1896–1965), member of the World War II Dutch resistance
Andreas Mies (born 1990), German tennis player

Places
 Mies, Switzerland, a municipality
the German name for Mežica in Slovenia
the German name for Stříbro in the Czech Republic
the German name for the Mže river in the Czech Republic and Germany

Ships
HNLMS Mies,  a Dutch Navy tugboat in service 1946–47
ST Mies, Dutch East Indian tugboat in service 1947–53 and an Indonesian tugboat in service 1958–83
KRI Mies, an Indonesian Navy tugboat in service 1953–58

Other
Battle of Tachov or Battle of Mies, fought in Bohemia in 1427 as part of the Hussite Wars

See also
Jacob of Mies (1372–1429), Bohemian reformer
Mie (disambiguation)